Jean Louis Pascal Angan (born 19 April 1986, in Odienné) is an Ivorian-Beninese international football player who last played for Al-Nasr in Kuwait.

Career
Angan began his career with AS Denguelé and joined later Issia Wazi. After a few years in the Ivory Coast, he joined Tonnerre d'Abomey FC. Angan played two years in Benin with Tonnerre d'Abomey FC and he moved to Wydad Casablanca in December 2008. He joined CR Belouizdad in July 2012.

International career
The Ivorian-born player was called for the Benin U-21 team and made his debut for the senior team in May 2009.

References

External links
 
 

1986 births
Living people
Beninese footballers
Ivorian footballers
Benin international footballers
2010 Africa Cup of Nations players
Wydad AC players
CR Belouizdad players
Association football midfielders
Expatriate footballers in Morocco
Issia Wazy players
Ivorian expatriate sportspeople in Morocco
Expatriate footballers in Algeria
Expatriate footballers in Kuwait
AS Denguélé players
People from Odienné
Tonnerre d'Abomey FC players
Kuwait Premier League players
Al-Nasr SC (Kuwait) players
Ivorian expatriate sportspeople in Kuwait
Ivorian expatriate sportspeople in Algeria
Beninese expatriate sportspeople in Algeria
Beninese expatriate sportspeople in Kuwait
Beninese expatriate sportspeople in Morocco
Beninese people of Ivorian descent